Carlo Lombardo dei Baroni Lombardo di San Chirico (Naples, 28 November 1869 – Milan, 19 December 1959) known also under the composer-pseudonyms Léon Bard, Leo Bard, Leblanc and M. Fernandez, was an Italian operetta impresario, comedian, librettist, publisher and "composer" of pasticcio productions of other composers' music. He is regarded in Italy as the father of the late 19th and early 20th Century revival in Italian operetta.

Lombardo was responsible, in a somewhat debatable manner, for getting Pietro Mascagni to write the operetta Sì. His brother was the conductor and composer Costantino Lombardo. His publishing house, Lombardo Editore, continues to publish sheet music for operettas.

Operettas and pasticcios
La Regina del Fonografo (The Queen of the Phonograph), music Carlo Lombardo (Leon Bard), libretto Carlo Lombardo e Gil Blas, ca. 1915
La duchessa del Bal Tabarin, 1917
Madama di Tebe, libretto and music by Lombardo, Milan, 7 March 1918
Sì, music by Pietro Mascagni, Rome, Teatro Quirino, 13 December 1919
Il re di Chez-Maxim, music Mario Pasquale Costa, 1919
La danza delle libellule, music by Franz Lehár and Carlo Lombardo, Milan 3 May 1922
, music Mario Pasquale Costa, Turin, 16 December 1922
, music Virgilio Ranzato and Carlo Lombardo, Milan, Teatro Lirico, 23 November 1923
, music Virgilio Ranzato, Milan, 18 December 1925
La casa innamorata, libretto Renato Simoni 1929

Recordings
 La duquesa de Bal Tabarin – Spanish zarzuela version of the Italian operetta – Elsa del Campo, Tomás Álvarez, Dolores Pérez, Santiago Ramalle, Coros de Radio Nacional de España, Orquesta de Cámara de Madrid, Enrique Estela, director

References

External links
 Biography at Lombardo Editore 
 Libretto for Il paese dei campanelli in Italian on archive.org

1869 births
1959 deaths
Musicians from Naples